Iberia had numerous commercial contacts with Phoenician merchants, and later with the Carthaginians, who conquered the Mediterranean part of Iberia and remained there until the Punic wars and the Romanization of the peninsula.

Background

The Phoenicians were a people from the eastern Mediterranean who were mainly traders from the cities of Tyre, Sidon, and Byblos. They established many trading colonies around the Mediterranean Sea, including colonies in Spain. In the year 814 BC, they founded the city of Carthage on the north African coast in what is now Tunisia. After the fall of Phoenicia to the Babylonians and then the Persians, Carthage became the most powerful Phoenician city in the Mediterranean and the Carthaginians annexed many of the other Phoenician colonies around the coasts of the western Mediterranean, such as Hadrumetum and Thapsus. They also annexed territory in Sicily, Africa, Sardinia. The Spanish city of Cartagena was founded around 227 BC by the Carthaginian Hasdrubal the Fair as Qart Hadasht (meaning 'New Town'), the same name as the original city of Carthage.

Expansion into Iberia

After the defeat of Carthage in the First Punic War, the Carthaginian general Hamilcar Barca crushed a mercenary revolt in Africa and trained a new army consisting of Numidians along with mercenaries and other infantry. In 236 BC, he led an expedition to Iberia where he hoped to gain a new empire for Carthage to compensate for the territories that had been lost in the recent conflicts with Rome and to serve as a base for vengeance against the Romans.

In eight years, by force of arms and diplomacy, Hamilcar secured an extensive territory, covering around half of the Iberian Peninsula, and Iberian soldiers later came to make up a large part of the army that his son Hannibal led into the Italian Peninsula to fight the Romans, but Hamilcar's premature death in battle (228 BC) prevented him from completing the conquest of the Iberian Peninsula and was soon followed by the collapse of the short lived empire he had established.

Fall of the Empire
The fall of Carthage's Iberian territories came in the Second Punic War. In the year 209 BC, after the Romans had landed on Iberia under the command of Scipio Africanus, they captured the centre of Punic power in Iberia, Nova Carthago (modern day Cartagena). They then moved south and faced the Punic army of Hasdrubal Barca in the Battle of Baecula but were not able to prevent him from continuing his march to Italy in order to reinforce his brother Hannibal. The catastrophic defeat of Carthaginian forces at Ilipa in 206 BC sealed the fate of the Carthaginian presence in Iberia. It was followed by the Roman capture of Gades after the city had already rebelled against Carthaginian rule. A last attempt was made by Mago in 205 BC to recapture Cartago Nova while the Roman presence was shaken by a mutiny and an Iberian uprising against their new overlords. But the attack was repulsed. So in the same year he left Iberia, setting sail from the Balearic islands to Italy with his remaining forces.

Art and artefacts of Phoenician influence in Iberia
Four Iberian "Ladies": Lady of Cerro de los Santos, Lady of Baza, Lady of Guardamar, and Lady of Elche, are dated around 4th century BC.

The Lady of Guardamar, found in 1987, is in the Museum of Alicante. When the Lady of Elche was found, it was thought to be of Hellenic influence, but since the discovery of the Lady of Guardamar in 1987, in the Phoenician (Carthaginian) site of Guardamar near Alicante (Lucentum), Phoenician would seem to be the appropriate designation.

This series of sculptures can be seen as types of funerary urns to hold ashes. There has been speculation that the Elche bust was originally full-length.  Mythological animals of an earlier period – 6th–5th century BC: the Bull of Osuna, the Sphinx of Agost and the Bicha of Balazote, are in the National Archaeological Museum of Spain, in Madrid.

See also
Carthaginian currency, including the Barcid mints in Iberia
Timeline of Portuguese history

References

Ancient history of the Iberian Peninsula
6th century BC
5th century BC
4th century BC
3rd century BC
Carthage